The Roman Catholic Archdiocese of Nouméa (Latin: Archidioecesis Numeanus; French: Archidiocèse de Nouméa) is  a Metropolitan Archdiocese in New Caledonia.  It is responsible for the suffragan dioceses of Port-Vila and Wallis et Futuna.

Ordinaries
, S. M. (1847–1850), appointed Vicar Apostolic of Archipelago of the Navigators {Arcipelago dei Navigatori}, American Samoa, Pacific (Oceania)
Pierre Rougeyron, S. M. (1855–1873)
Pierre-Ferdinand Vitte, S. M. (1873–1880)
Alphonse-Hilarion Fraysse, S. M. (1880–1905)
Claude-Marie Chanrion, S. M. (1905–1937)
Edoardo Bresson, S. M. (1937–1956)
Pierre-Paul-Émile Martin, S. M. (1956–1972)
Eugène Klein, M.S.C. (1972–1981)
Michel-Marie-Bernard Calvet, S. M. (1981– )

External links and references

Nouméa
Nouméa
Nouméa
Nouméa
1847 establishments in Oceania